Charles Gresham Marmion, Jr. (August 19, 1905 - December 7, 2000) was fifth bishop of the Episcopal Diocese of Kentucky, serving from 1954 to 1974.

Early life and education
Marmion was born on August 19, 1905, in Houston, Texas, the son of Charles Gresham Marmion and Katherine Angie Rankin. His younger brother, William H. Marmion, was also a prelate of the Episcopal Church who served as Bishop of Southwestern Virginia. He was educated at the public schools of Houston, Texas. He then studied at the University of Texas and graduated with a Bachelor of Arts in business in 1930. He then studied at the Virginia Theological Seminary and earned a Bachelor of Divinity in 1933. He married Doris Anita Dissen on July 1, 1937, and together had three children. He was awarded a Doctor of Divinity from Sewanee: The University of the South in 1954.

Ordained Ministry
Marmion was ordained deacon in July 1933 and priest in June 1934 by Bishop Clinton S. Quin of Texas. In 1933, he became rector of Christ Church in Eagle Lake, Texas and St John's Church in Columbus, Texas asst. He 1937, he transferred to St Alban's Church in Washington, D.C., to serve as its rector. Between 1940 and 1945, he served as rector of St George's Church in Port Arthur, Texas, and then, between 1945 and 1954, as rector of the Church of the Incarnation in Dallas, Texas.

Bishop
On October 2, 1953, during a convention held in Christ Church Cathedral, Louisville, Kentucky, Marmion was elected on the second ballot as the fifth Bishop of Kentucky. He formally accepted the election on October 22. His younger brother was elected Bishop of Southwestern Virginia that November. Marmion was consecrated Bishop of Kentucky on February 2, 1954, by Presiding Bishop Henry Knox Sherrill. During his episcopacy, parishes in the diocese were encouraged to be fiscally responsible. He also oversaw the establishment of a fund to assist with construction projects, including All Saints' Episcopal Center. He was also a promoter of ecumenism as encouraged after the Second Vatican Council. Marmion retired in 1974.

References

External links 
Bishop Marmion of Kentucky Dies

1905 births
2000 deaths
20th-century Anglican bishops in the United States
Episcopal bishops of Kentucky